The 1956–57 Southern Football League season was the 54th in the history of the league, an English football competition.

No new clubs had joined the league for this season so the league consisted of 22 clubs from previous season. Kettering Town were champions, winning their first Southern League title. Five Southern League clubs applied to join the Football League at the end of the season, but none were successful. At the end of the season Welsh FA refused to sanction Llanelly's stay in the Southern League, the club left the league after seven years and switched to the Welsh football pyramid.

League table

Football League elections
Five Southern League clubs applied for election to the Football League. However, none were successful as all four League clubs were re-elected.

References

Southern Football League seasons
S